Pablo Facundo Bonvín (born 15 April 1981, in Concepción del Uruguay, Entre Ríos Province) is an Argentine former football striker.

Club career
Bonvín started his career at Boca Juniors, where he came through the youth system to play in the first team in 2000. Later that year he was loaned to English Premier League club Newcastle United. After one season with the club he was then loaned to Sheffield Wednesday. At Sheffield Wednesday highlights include scoring a last minute winner against Walsall and scoring twice in a 3-1 win over Barnsley. In 2002 he returned to Boca Juniors.

In 2003, he was transferred to Racing Club de Avellaneda, and then to then second-tier Argentinos Juniors later that year. In 2004 Bonvín returned to the Primera División with Quilmes. In 2005, he played for Dorados de Sinaloa in the Primera División de México. And he returned to Argentina again, this time to play for second-tier San Martín de Mendoza. However, the club were relegated at the end of the 2005–06 season, and Bonvin once again changed clubs, returning to Argentinos Juniors in the Primera División, his last club in Argentina was Platense, he retired after a brief spell with Club Deportivo Universidad Católica del Ecuador.

References

External links
Profile at Sporting Heroes
 BDFA profile

1981 births
Living people
People from Uruguay Department
Association football forwards
Argentine footballers
C.D. Universidad Católica del Ecuador footballers
Boca Juniors footballers
Newcastle United F.C. players
Sheffield Wednesday F.C. players
Racing Club de Avellaneda footballers
Argentinos Juniors footballers
Dorados de Sinaloa footballers
Quilmes Atlético Club footballers
Club Atlético Platense footballers
Boyacá Chicó F.C. footballers
Argentine Primera División players
English Football League players
Liga MX players
Categoría Primera A players
Argentine expatriate sportspeople in Mexico
Argentine expatriate sportspeople in England
Argentine expatriate footballers
Expatriate footballers in England
Expatriate footballers in Colombia
Expatriate footballers in Ecuador
Expatriate footballers in Mexico
Sportspeople from Entre Ríos Province